The 4th Women's Boat Race took place on 10 March 1934. The contest was between crews from the Universities of Oxford and Cambridge and held on the River Thames.

Background
The first Women's Boat Race was conducted on The Isis in 1927.

Crews
Cambridge were represented by Newnham while Oxford saw a mix of St Hugh's and Oxford Home-Students.

Race
The contest was won by Oxford, with the victory taking the overall record in the competition to 2–2.

See also
The Boat Race 1934

References

External links
 Official website

Women's Boat Race
1934 in English sport
March 1934 sports events
Boat
Boat
1934 sports events in London